Journalisten is a member magazine of the Swedish Journalist Association which has been in circulation since 1904. It is headquartered in Stockholm, Sweden.

History and profile
The magazine was first published in March 1904 and appeared five times per until 1920s when it became a monthly publication. The Swedish Journalist Association is the owner and publisher of the magazine. Its founding editor-in-chief was John Törnequist. It was renamed as Journalisten in 1950. In 1980 Karin Alfredsson was named as the editor-in-chief of the magazine of which frequency was changed from 12 issues to 39 issues per year.

Its website was launched in 1997. In Autumn 2008 Journalisten began to appear fifteen times per year. Later it came out ten times per year.

References

External links

1904 establishments in Sweden
Monthly magazines published in Sweden
Magazines established in 1904
Magazines published in Stockholm
Swedish-language magazines
Magazines about the media
News magazines published in Sweden
Ten times annually magazines